After excluding groups not related, the informal group Sigmurethra has become the suborder Helicina, with the following infraorders and a collection of families with no superfamily：
Suborder Helicina ("Non-Achatinoid Clade")
Infraorder Arionoidei
Infraorder Clausilioidei
Infraorder Helicoidei: formed from Helicoidea  and Sagdoidea 
Infraorder Limacoidei: formed from original limacoid clade
Infraorder Oleacinoidei
Oleacinoidea: formed from original Testacelloidea but with the family Testacellidae excluded;
Haplotrematoidea: formed from original Rhytidoidea and Haplotrematidae
Infraorder Orthalicoidei
Infraorder Pupilloidei (Orthurethra)
Infraorder Rhytidoidei: formed by Rhytidoidea merging with contents from Acavoidea.
Infraorder Succineoidei (Elasmognatha)
 Infraorder Helicina (temporary name)

References

Stylommatophora
Mollusc suborders